SM UB-101 was a German Type UB III submarine or U-boat in the Imperial German Navy during World War I. She was commissioned into the Imperial German Navy on 31 October 1918 as SM UB-101.

UB-101 was surrendered on 26 November 1918 and broken up in Felixstowe in 1919/20.

Construction

She was built by AG Vulcan of Hamburg and following just under a year of construction, launched at Hamburg on 27 August 1918. UB-101 was commissioned later the same year under the command of Oblt.z.S. Eugen von Beulwitz. Like all Type UB III submarines, UB-101 carried 10 torpedoes and was armed with a  deck gun. UB-101 had a displacement of  while surfaced and  when submerged. Her engines enabled her to travel at  when surfaced and  when submerged.

References

Notes

Citations

Bibliography

 

German Type UB III submarines
World War I submarines of Germany
U-boats commissioned in 1918
1918 ships
Ships built in Hamburg